The Gare de Charenton was a former French railway station on the Paris–Marseille railway, located in the commune of Charenton-le-Pont .

It opened on 8 August 1849. In 1942 it was closed and immediately demolished.

Railway stations in France opened in 1849
Railway stations closed in 1942
Railway stations in Val-de-Marne
Defunct railway stations in Île-de-France